Domenick DiCicco Jr. (born January 24, 1963) is an American Republican Party politician who served in the New Jersey General Assembly from 2010 to 2012, where he represented the 4th Legislative District.

DiCicco served in the Assembly on the Commerce and Economic Development Committee and the Consumer Affairs Committee.

He received a B.A. in political science from Rowan University, an M.B.A. degree from Pennsylvania State University, and a J.D. degree from Delaware Law School (now Widener University School of Law). He is the executive vice president and general counsel of Alexander Gallo Holdings, LLC.

In 2009, DiCicco ran for the General Assembly seat vacated by Sandra Love, a Democrat. Running in a district where Democrats outnumber Republicans two to one, DiCicco defeated the Democratic candidate, local school board president William Collins, by a margin of 601 votes.  He was sworn into office on January 12, 2010.

In the 2011 apportionment based on the results of the 2010 United States census, DiCicco was placed in the 3rd District where he faced Democratic incumbents John J. Burzichelli and Celeste Riley. Burzichelli (with 25,172 votes) and Riley (23,960) won re-election, defeating DiCicco (20,268) and his running mate Bob Villare (20,528) DiCicco's loss made his seat the only gain by the Democrats in the Assembly in the 2011 election cycle. His seat in the 4th District was filled by Gabriela Mosquera, a Democrat.
 
He resides in Franklin Township, Gloucester County.

References

External links
Assemblyman DiCicco's legislative webpage, New Jersey Legislature
New Jersey Legislature financial disclosure forms
2010 2009 
Assembly Member Domenick DiCicco (NJ), Project Vote Smart

1963 births
Living people
Republican Party members of the New Jersey General Assembly
New Jersey lawyers
Businesspeople from New Jersey
People from Franklin Township, Gloucester County, New Jersey
Politicians from Gloucester County, New Jersey
Rowan University alumni
Smeal College of Business alumni
Widener University alumni
21st-century American politicians